Aaron Hohlbein (born August 16, 1985, in Middleton, Wisconsin) is an American soccer player who is currently without a club.

Career
Aaron Hohlbein joined the coaching staff at University of Wisconsin in 2015 and is currently the assistant coach of Men's Soccer.

College and Amateur
Hohlbein played college soccer at the University of Wisconsin–Madison from 2003 to 2006. Over four years he started in all 77 of his appearances and managed 6 goals and 7 assists. During his college years he also played with the Michigan Bucks of the United Soccer Leagues and the Princeton 56ers in the National Premier Soccer League.

Professional
He was drafted in the first round, 3rd overall, by the Kansas City Wizards in 2007 MLS Supplemental Draft.  On August 5, 2010, he was loaned to Miami FC for the remainder of the USSF D2 Pro League.

Hohlbein was chosen by the Columbus Crew with the second selection of stage 1 of the 2010 MLS Re-Entry Draft on December 8, 2010. He elected not to sign with the Major League Soccer club and instead signed with Miami FC, later renamed Fort Lauderdale Strikers, of the second-tier North American Soccer League on February 1, 2011. The captain and a mainstay at the center of the Strikers' defense, Hohlbein suffered a knee injury in July that ruled him out for the rest of the campaign. The Fort Lauderdale Strikers released Hohlbein at the end of the 2011 season.

References

External links
 MLS player profile

1985 births
Living people
American soccer players
Sporting Kansas City players
Flint City Bucks players
Wisconsin Badgers men's soccer players
Princeton 56ers players
Miami FC (2006) players
Fort Lauderdale Strikers players
USL League Two players
Major League Soccer players
USSF Division 2 Professional League players
North American Soccer League players
Soccer players from Wisconsin
Sporting Kansas City draft picks
Association football defenders
People from Middleton, Wisconsin
Wisconsin Badgers men's soccer coaches
American soccer coaches